Assara pinivora is a species of snout moth in the genus Assara. It was described by Edward Meyrick in 1933 and is known from the Kashmir region of what was then British India.

References

Moths described in 1933
Phycitini
Moths of Asia